La Chapelle-du-Lou (Gallo: La Chapèll-du-Lóc) is a former commune in the Ille-et-Vilaine department of Brittany in northwestern France. On 1 January 2016, it was merged into the new commune La Chapelle-du-Lou-du-Lac.

Population
People from La Chapelle-du-Lou are called in French Chapellois.

Notable people
 

René-Jean de Botherel du Plessis (1745–1805), counter-revolutionary

See also
Communes of the Ille-et-Vilaine department

References

External links

Official website 

Former communes of Ille-et-Vilaine